Lessinodytes is a genus of beetles in the family Carabidae, containing the following species:

 Lessinodytes caoduroi Vigna Taglianti, 1982
 Lessinodytes glacialis Vigna Taglianti & Sciaky, 1988
 Lessinodytes pivai Vigna Taglianti & Sciaky, 1988

References

Trechinae